The Aba is a river in Russia; a left tributary of the Tom. It flows across the steppes, and merges with the Tom near Novokuznetsk. There are coal deposits in the river's basin. The Aba people live in the river's vicinity.

References 

Rivers of Kemerovo Oblast